First Methodist Episcopal Church of Nyack, also known as Old Stone Church, is a historic Methodist Episcopal church on North Broadway, south of the junction of North Broadway and Birchwood Avenue in Upper Nyack, Rockland County, New York. It was built in 1812-1813 and is a one-story, three by two bay, sandstone building on a stone foundation.  It features a moderately pitched gable roof.

It was listed on the National Register of Historic Places in 1998. It was purchased by the Village of Upper Nyack in 2007 and has since been used as a village meeting place as well as being made available for private events.

References

Churches on the National Register of Historic Places in New York (state)
Federal architecture in New York (state)
19th-century Episcopal church buildings
Churches completed in 1813
Churches in Rockland County, New York
National Register of Historic Places in Rockland County, New York